Huda Lutfi is a visual artist and cultural historian from Cairo, Egypt. Lutfi's works include paintings, collages, and installations that reflect a diverse styles including pharaonic, Coptic, Western, Islamic, and contemporary international.

Early life and education 
Lutfi was born in Cairo in 1948. She earned a Ph.D. in Islamic Culture and History from McGill University.

Career 
Lutfi joined the facility of the Department of Arab and Islamic Civilization at The American University in Cairo.

References 

Egyptian artists
Living people
1948 births